Denton Holme is an inner city district in Carlisle, Cumbria, England. The population of this ward was 6,383 taken at the 2011 census.

Denton Holme is usually regarded as a "village within the city" and is situated to the immediate south west of the city centre on the western bank of the River Caldew.  A man-made stream or mill race known as the Little Caldew flows through and underneath the area.

Today it is a mostly residential area but in the nineteenth century and most of the twentieth century along with the neighbouring districts of Caldewgate and Wapping it was Carlisle's main industrial district with many textile mills, engineering works and other factories such as car seat manufacturers and confectioners.  Today, very few factories remain although the last mill, Ferguson Brothers, owned by Coats Viyella, at Holme Head, only closed in the 1990s.

The majority of the housing is red-brick terraced, a few of which are listed buildings, such as Bridge Terrace built in the 1850s. Many of the side streets are still cobbled rather than tarmacked, although some new housing has been built in recent years and some of the former factories have been converted into flats. 

The main street, Denton Street, has many small shops along it and other businesses including a bingo hall and a branch of the Cumberland Building Society.  There was at one time a cinema in the suburb, located in what is now the Bingo hall.

There is a primary school at Holme Head, built by and named after Robert Ferguson, and the former Morley Street School has been converted into a public library.

There are four churches in Denton Holme including the Church of England Parish Church, St James, Carlisle Christian Fellowship and The Lighthouse Baptist Church. 

At Shaddon Mill, on the boundary of Denton Holme and Caldewgate, stands a very tall chimney which was at one time the tallest in the UK.  This structure, which is known as "Dixons Chimney", is now slightly short of its original height and has recently been restored and is a well-known local landmark. It is named after its first owner, Peter Dixon, who built the mill in 1835–6. The architect was Richard Tattersall.

References

Areas of Carlisle, Cumbria